Disaster risk reduction (DRR) sometimes called disaster risk management (DRM) is a systematic approach to identifying, assessing and reducing the risks of disaster. It aims to reduce socio-economic vulnerabilities to disaster as well as dealing with the environmental and other hazards that trigger them. The most commonly cited definition of Disaster risk reduction is one used by UN agencies such as United Nations Office for Disaster Risk Reduction (UNDRR) and the United Nations Development Programme (UNDP): "The conceptual framework of elements considered with the possibilities to minimize vulnerabilities and disaster risks throughout a society, to avoid (prevention) or to limit (mitigation and preparedness) the adverse impacts of hazards, within the broad context of sustainable development." 

Disaster risk reduction has been strongly influenced by the research on vulnerability since the mid-1970s as well as the mapping of natural disaster risks. Disaster risk reduction is the responsibility of development and relief agencies alike. It should be an integral part of the way such organizations do their work, not an add-on or one-off action. Disaster risk reduction is very wide-ranging: Its scope is much broader and deeper than conventional emergency management. There is potential for disaster risk reduction initiatives in most sectors of development and humanitarian work.

Development of the concept and approach

From disaster management

The evolution of disaster thinking and practice since the 1970s has seen a progressively wider and deeper understanding of why disasters happen, accompanied by more integrated, holistic approaches to reduce their impact on society through reducing risk before it occurs (disaster risk reduction, or disaster risk management) as well as managing impacts when disasters occur (disaster management). It is being widely embraced by international agencies, governments, disaster planners and civil society organisations.

DRR is such an all-embracing concept that it has proved difficult to define or explain in detail, although the broad idea is clear enough. Inevitably, there are different definitions in the technical literature, but it is generally understood to mean the broad development and application of policies, strategies and practices to minimise vulnerabilities and disaster risks throughout society. The term 'disaster risk management' (DRM) is often used in the same context and to mean much the same thing: a systematic approach to identifying, assessing and reducing risks of all kinds associated with hazards and human activities. It is more properly applied to the operational aspects of DRR: the practical implementation of DRR initiatives.

climate change adaptation 
Climate change, through rising temperatures, changing rainfall patterns, and changing sea levels, will affect the nature of hydro meteorological disasters, such as droughts, floods, and cyclones. The IPCC issued a special report in 2012 "Managing the risks of extreme events and disasters to advance climate change adaptation" stating that a changing climate leads to changes in the frequency, intensity, spatial extent, duration, and timing of extreme weather and climate events, and can result in unprecedented extreme weather and climate events. Similarly there has been an increase in the economic losses from weather- and climate-related disasters, which contributed to $165 billion of economic losses worldwide in 2018 according to estimates from insurance giant Swiss Re. There are growing efforts to closely link DRR and climate change adaptation, both in policy and practice.

This linkage has clearly revealed the significance of disaster risk reduction for sustainable development planning. An underlying process refers to the ability of disaster risk management to alter existing development trajectories as transformation, which “involve[s] fundamental changes in the attributes of a system, including value systems; regulatory, legislative, or bureaucratic regimes; financial institutions; and technological or biophysical systems”. Transformation occurs as society learns. This learning includes building partnerships, which helps to increase local capacity and contribute to institutional change. This in turn allows society to continually move from vulnerability, adaptation and development to resilience.

Resilience 

In disaster risk reduction, the concept of resilience expresses one goal of disaster prevention and response. Resilience refers to the ability of a community or society to preserve its essential structure and function in the face of stress and shocks. Resilience is closely connected to the concept of vulnerability, though resilience tends to be a higher, strategic goal of building social systems, while vulnerability is a tool for analyzing the properties of those systems.

The term resilience issues from the ecological sciences as a description of a system’s response to change, originally coming from the Latin resilire, “to bounce [back]”. It was first used in the present sense by C.S. Holling in 1973, as a measure of the ability of relationships within a natural system to persist, i.e., for the organisms within the system to not go extinct. Resilience in the ecological sense is not equilibrium: it differs from stability, the ability of a system to resist fluctuation. A system that is resilient, therefore, can undergo changes without losing its core structure and function. In the case of human systems, that function is survival and the necessities of life.

Within the field of disaster risk reduction, one widely-accepted definition of resilience comes from UNISDR: “The ability of a system, community or society exposed to hazards to resist, absorb, accommodate to and recover from the effects of a hazard in a timely and efficient manner, including through the preservation and restoration of its essential basic structures and functions.”

The importance of resilience in disaster risk management can be seen from the centrality of the term in the 2005-2015 Hyogo Framework for Action, which was subtitled “Building the Resilience of Nations and Communities to Disasters.” Building resilience, therefore, is currently understood as the goal of disaster risk reduction.

The disaster resilience of infrastructure systems is a critical challenge for developing Asia. Exposure to climate and geophysical hazards is already widespread. Infrastructure has a central role to play in supporting economic resilience. To sustain economic development and reduce poverty, the region must have disaster-resilient infrastructure systems, with provisions for reducing, transferring, and managing the climate and disaster risks to the systems.

Policy arena

There have been growing calls for greater clarity about the components of DRR and about indicators of progress toward resilience — a challenge that the international community took up at the UN's World Conference on Disaster Reduction (WCDR) in Kobe, Japan, in 2005, only days after the 2004 Indian Ocean earthquake. The WCDR began the process of pushing international agencies and national governments beyond the vague rhetoric of most policy statements and toward setting clear targets and commitments for DRR.

Hyogo Framework for Action 
The first step in this process was the formal approval at the WCDR of the Hyogo Framework for Action (2005–2015) (HFA). This was the first internationally accepted framework for DRR. It set out an ordered sequence of objectives (outcome – strategic goals – priorities), with five priorities for action attempting to 'capture' the main areas of DRR intervention. The UN's biennial Global Platform for Disaster Risk Reduction provided an opportunity for the UN and its member states to review progress against the Hyogo Framework. It held its first session 5–7 June 2007 in Geneva, Switzerland, where UNISDR is based. The subsequent Global Platforms were held in June 2009, May 2011 and May 2013, all in Geneva.

Sendai Framework for Disaster Risk Reduction

Other international initiatives 
UN initiatives have helped to refine and promote the concept at international level, stimulated initially by the UN's designation of the 1990s as the International Decade for Natural Disaster Reduction. In 1999, UN member states approved the International Strategy for Disaster Risk Reduction, which reflected a shift from the traditional emphasis on disaster response to disaster reduction, by seeking to promote a "culture of prevention".

Disaster risk is an indicator of poor development, so reducing disaster risk requires integrating DRR practice into the 17 Sustainable Development Goals. Decision makers need to manage risks, not just disasters.

Regional initiatives

Africa 
Several African Regional Economic Communities have drafted gender-responsive DRR strategies. This includes the Southern African Development Community's Gender-Responsive Disaster Risk Reduction Strategic Plan and Plan of Action 2020-30; the Economic Commission of Central Africa States' Gender-Responsive Disaster Risk Reduction Strategy and Action Plan 2020-30; the Economic Commission of West African States' Disaster Risk Reduction Gender Strategy and Action Plan 2020-2030 and the Intergovernmental Authority on Development's Regional Strategy and Action Plan for Mainstreaming Gender in Disaster Risk Management and Climate Change Adaptation.

Bangladesh 

Based on the Climate Risk Index, Bangladesh is one of the most disaster-prone countries in the world. Bangladesh is highly vulnerable to different types of disasters because of climatic variability, extreme events, high population density, high incidence of poverty and social inequity, poor institutional capacity, inadequate financial resources, and poor infrastructure. Bangladesh commenced its disaster preparedness following the cyclone of 1991 and has now a comprehensive National Plan for Disaster Management which provides mechanisms at both national and sub-national levels.

European Union

In addition to providing funding to humanitarian aid, the European Commission's Directorate-General for European Civil Protection and Humanitarian Aid Operations (DG-ECHO) is in charge of the EU Civil Protection Mechanism  to coordinate the response to disasters in Europe and beyond and contributes to at least 75% of the transport and/or operational costs of deployments. Established in 2001, the Mechanism fosters cooperation among national civil protection authorities across Europe. Currently 34 countries are members of the Mechanism; all 27 EU Member States in addition to Iceland, Norway, Serbia, North Macedonia, Montenegro, Turkey and Bosnia and Herzegovina. The Mechanism was set up to enable coordinated assistance from the participating states to victims of natural and man-made disasters in Europe and elsewhere.

Cost and financing 
Economic costs of disasters are on the rise, but most humanitarian investment is currently spent on responding to disasters, rather than managing their future risks. Only 4% of the estimated $10 billion in annual humanitarian assistance is devoted to prevention (source), and yet every dollar spent on risk reduction saves between $5 and $10 in economic losses from disasters. A case study of Niger showed positive cost and benefit results for preparedness spending across 3 different scenarios (from the absolute level of disaster loss, to the potential reduction in disaster loss and the discount rate), estimating that every $1 spent results in $3.25 to $5.31 of benefit.

Countries are starting to develop national disaster risk financing strategies, using risk layering. Lesotho estimated that, through adopting such an approach, the government could save on average $4 million per year, and as much as $42 million for an extreme shock.

Disaster research 
Disaster research deals with conducting field and survey research on group, organizational and community preparation for, response to, and recovery from natural and technological disasters and other community-wide crises.

Related field such as anthropology study human populations, environments, and events that create utter chaos. They research long-lasting effects on multiple areas of society including: social organization, political organization and empowerment, economic consequences, environmental degradation, human and environmental adaptation and interactions, oral history, traditional knowledge, psychological consequences, public health and the broader historical record of the affected region.

Public health preparedness requires cultural awareness, respect and preparation; different parties acting during a relief period are driven by cultural and religious beliefs, including taboos. If these are not acknowledged or known by emergency and medical personnel, treatment can become compromised by both a patient refusing to be treated and by personnel refusing to treat victims because of a violation of values.

Research history

United States 
The Disaster Research Center (DRC), was the first social science research center in the world devoted to the study of disasters. It was established at Ohio State University in 1963 and moved to the University of Delaware in 1985.

The Center conducts field and survey research on group, organizational and community preparation for, response to, and recovery from natural and technological disasters and other community-wide crises. Disaster Research Center researchers have carried out systematic studies on a broad range of disaster types, including hurricanes, floods, earthquakes, tornadoes, hazardous chemical incidents, and plane crashes. Disaster Research Center has also done research on civil disturbances and riots, including the 1992 Los Angeles unrest. Staff have conducted nearly 600 field studies since the Center's inception, traveling to communities throughout the United States and to a number of foreign countries, including Mexico, Canada, Japan, Italy, and Turkey. Faculty members from the University's Sociology and Criminal Justice Department and Engineering Department direct the Disaster Research Center's projects. The staff also includes postdoctoral fellows, graduate students, undergraduates and research support personnel.

The Disaster Research Center not only maintains its own databases but also serves as a repository for materials collected by other agencies and researchers, and it contains over 50,000 items, making it the most complete collection on the social and behavioral aspects of disasters in the world.

Studies in the field of Disaster Research are supported by many diverse sources, such as:
 Federal Emergency Management Agency (FEMA)
 Multidisciplinary Center for Earthquake Engineering Research
 National Institute of Mental Health
 National Oceanic and Atmospheric Administration Sea Grant Program
 Public Entity Risk Institute
 Social Science Research Council
 U.S. Geological Survey

Additionally, there are numerous academic and national policy boards in the realm of disaster research:
 National Academy of Sciences/National Research Council's Commission on International Disaster Assistance and Board on Natural Disasters
 National Science Foundation's Social Hazard Review Panel
 U.S. Committee on the UN Decade for Natural Disaster Reduction

Major international conferences and workshops 
With the growth of interest in disasters and disaster management, there are many conferences and workshops held on the topic, from local to global levels. Regular international conferences include:
 The annual conference of TIEMS: The International Emergency Management Society.
 The International Disaster and Risk Conferences (IDRC) and workshops, held each year since 2006, in Davos, Switzerland (even-numbered years), and other locations (odd numbered years).
 The meetings of the International Research Committee on Disasters (IRCD), held as part of the International Sociological Association's World Congress of Sociology.
 The biennial Global Platform for Disaster Risk Reduction is multi-stakeholder forum organized by the United Nations Office for Disaster Risk Reduction (UNDRR), which was established by the United Nations General Assembly to review progress, share knowledge, and discuss the latest developments and trends in reducing disaster risk.
 The World Reconstruction Conference (WRC) is a global forum that provides a platform for policy makers, experts, and practitioners from governments, international organizations, community-based organizations, the academia, and private sector from both developing and developed countries to come together to collect, assess, and share experiences in disaster recovery and reconstruction and take the policy dialogue forward.

Issues and challenges

Priorities
According to Mluver 1996 it is unrealistic to expect progress in every aspect of DRR : capacities and resources are insufficient. Governments and other organisations have to make what are in effect 'investment decisions', choosing which aspects of DRR to invest in, when, and in what sequence. This is made more complicated by the fact that many of the interventions advocated are developmental rather than directly related to disaster management. Most existing DRR guidance sidesteps this issue. One way of focusing is to consider only actions that are intended specifically to reduce disaster risk. This would at least distinguish from more general efforts toward sustainable development. The concept of  'invulnerable development' attempts this: In this formulation, invulnerable development is development directed toward reducing vulnerability to disaster, comprising 'decisions and activities that are intentionally designed and implemented to reduce risk and susceptibility, and also raise resistance and resilience to disaster'.

Partnerships and inter-organisational co-ordination
No single group or organisation can address every aspect of DRR. DRR thinking sees disasters as complex problems demanding a collective response. Co-ordination even in conventional emergency management is difficult, for many, organisations may converge on a disaster area to assist. Across the broader spectrum of DRR, the relationships between types of organisation and between sectors (public, private and non-profit, as well as communities) become much more extensive and complex. DRR requires strong vertical and horizontal linkages (central-local relations become important). In terms of involving civil society organisations, it should mean thinking broadly about which types of organisation to involve (i.e., conventional NGOs and such organisations as trades unions, religious institutions, amateur radio operators (as in the US and India), universities and research institutions).

Communities and their organizations
Traditional emergency management/civil defense thinking makes two misleading assumptions about communities. First, it sees other forms of social organisation (voluntary and community-based organisations, informal social groupings and families) as irrelevant to emergency action. Spontaneous actions by affected communities or groups (e.g., search and rescue) are viewed as irrelevant or disruptive, because they are not controlled by the authorities. The second assumption is that disasters produce passive 'victims' who are overwhelmed by crisis or dysfunctional behavior (panic, looting, self-seeking activities). They therefore, need to be told what to do and their behavior must be controlled — in extreme cases, through the imposition of martial law. There is plenty of sociological research to refute such 'myths'.

An alternative viewpoint, informed by a considerable volume of research, emphasises the importance of communities and local organisations in disaster risk management. The rationale for community-based disaster risk management that it responds to local problems and needs, capitalises on local knowledge and expertise, is cost-effective, improves the likelihood of sustainability through genuine 'ownership' of projects, strengthens community technical and organisational capacities, and empowers people by enabling them to tackle these and other challenges. Local people and organisations are the main actors in risk reduction and disaster response in any case. Consequently, it has been seen that understanding the social capital already existent in the community can greatly help reducing the risk at the community level.

Learning from a Colombian community
Widespread flooding affected most of Colombia's 32 regions between 2010 and 2012. Some 3.6 million people were affected. On 24 April 2012, President Juan Manuel Santos enacted a law which aimed at improving natural disaster response and prevention at both national and local level. The Universidad Del Norte, based in Barranquilla, has investigated how one community reacted to the destruction caused by the floods, in an effort to try to make Colombian communities more resilient to similar events occurring in the future. With funding from the Climate & Development Knowledge Network, the project team spent 18 months working with women from the municipality of Manatí, in the Department of Atlántico.

Here, 5,733 women were affected by the floods. They had to reconstruct their entire lives in a Manatí they could no longer recognise. The project team worked with the women to find out how they coped with the effects of the floods and to articulate the networks of reciprocity and solidarity that developed in the community. Their findings highlighted resilience strategies that the community used to respond to the extreme event. The researchers suggested that similar strategies could be used to inform government actions to reduce or manage risk from disasters. They also concluded that it is important to consider gender when planning for disasters as women and men often play very different roles and because, on average, disasters kill more women than men.

Governance
The DRR approach requires redefining the role of government disaster reduction. It is generally agreed that national governments should be main actors in DRR: They have a duty to ensure the safety of citizens, the resources and capacity to implement large-scale DRR, a mandate to direct or co-ordinate the work of others, and they create the necessary policy and legislative frameworks. These policies and programmes have to be coherent. More research is needed on the relationship between central government and other actors is another area requiring research.
In most countries, risk management is decentralized to local governments. In urban areas, the most widely used tool is the local development plan (municipal, comprehensive or general plan), followed by emergency and risk reduction plans that local governments are required to adopt by law and are updated every 4–5 years. Larger cities prefer stand-alone plans, called, depending on the context, sustainable, mitigation, or green plans. In rural areas, the mainstreaming of risk reduction policies into municipal (county or district) development plans prevails. In many contexts, especially South of the Sahara, this process clashes with the lack of funds or mechanisms for transferring resources from the central to the local budget. Too often plans do not integrate local, scientific and technical knowledge. Finally, they entrust the implementation of policies to individual inhabitants without having fully involved them in the decision-making process. The authentic representativeness of the communities and gender participation in the decision-making process still remain an objective of the local development plans instead of being the way to build them.

Accountability and rights
The principle of accountability lies at the heart of genuine partnership and participation in DRR. It applies to state institutions that are expected to be accountable through the democratic process and to private sector and non-profit organizations that are not subject to democratic control. Accountability is an emerging issue in disaster reduction work. Accountability should be primarily toward those who are vulnerable to hazards and affected by them.

Many organisations working in international aid and development are now committing themselves to a 'rights-based' approach. This tends to encompass human rights (i.e., those that are generally accepted through international agreements) and other rights that an agency believes should be accepted as human rights. In such contexts, the language of rights may be used vaguely, with a risk of causing confusion.  Security against disasters is not generally regarded as a right although it is addressed in some international codes, usually indirectly. The idea of a 'right to safety' is being discussed in some circles.

Gender 

Disaster risk is not gender-neutral. Studies have shown that women and girls are disproportionately impacted by disasters. Following the 2004 tsunami in the Indian Ocean, 77% and 72% of the deaths in the districts of North Aceh and Aceh Besar, Indonesia, were female. And in India 62% of people who died were female. This is due to socially-constructed gender roles that determine what norms and behaviors are acceptable for women and men, and girls and boys. In particular, women tend to take responsibility for home-based tasks and can be reluctant to leave their assets in the case of hazard warning; and often do not learn survival skills that can help in disasters, such as learning to swim or climb.

A gender-sensitive approach would identify how disasters affect men, women, boys and girls differently and shape policy that addresses people's specific vulnerabilities, concerns and needs.

See also

 Business continuity planning
 Center for Natural Hazards Research
 Emergency management
 Global catastrophic risk
 International Day for Disaster Reduction
 Risk management
 Vulnerability
 Hazard map

References

External links
 Ecosystem-based Disaster Risk Reduction
Disaster Risk Management Society, GC University, Lahore.
 Asian Disaster Preparedness Center
 FAO –  Platform for East and Central Africa
 EM-DAT: The International Disaster Database
 Global Facility for Disaster Reduction and Recovery
 United Nations Office for Disaster Risk Reduction
 Preventionweb – Building the resilience of nations and communities to disasters
 The World Bank, Hazards Management Unit
 United Nations Platform for Space-based Information for Disaster Management and Emergency Response

Disaster preparedness
Disaster management
Humanitarian aid
Natural disasters
International development
Climate change adaptation